The 1984 World Judo Championships were the 3rd edition of the Women's World Judo Championships, and were held in Vienna, Austria from 10–11 November, 1984.

Medal overview

Women

Medal table

External links
results of WC 1984 in Vienna on judoinside.com retrieved December 11, 2013
page of WC-results in the Judo Encyclopedia by T. Plavecz retrieved December 11, 2013

W
J
World Judo Championships
World Judo Championships
J